Pähtz,  Paehtz is a German surname. Notable people with the surname include:

 Elisabeth Pähtz (born 1985), German chess master
 Thomas Pähtz (born 1956), German chess master

German-language surnames